So Wrong It's Right is a British radio programme presented by Charlie Brooker in which panelists aim to give the "most wrong" answer to a question. They describe stories from their lives, conceive of new ideas on a theme and criticise aspects of the modern world. It aired three series in May–June 2010, March–April 2011 and May–June 2012 on BBC Radio 4. The first series of five episodes played at 11p.m. while the last two had six episodes premiering at 6:30p.m.

Format
Presenter Charlie Brooker awards a point to whichever of his three guests has the "most wrong" answer to each question asked. The first round, "Wrong Time, Wrong Place", sees each guest describing an anecdote from their lives on a particular theme. The second round, "Do Your Worst", has contestants come up with ideas on a theme—for instance, to create the worst sport at the Olympics. In an alternate second round, "This Putrid Modern Hell", panelists discuss what in the modern world is most annoying to them. "Random Wrongness"—the final round—is a sequence of quickfire questions.

Production
The programme aired on BBC Radio 4 in three series from 2010 to 2012. The first series aired at 11p.m. while the remaining two aired at 6p.m. In advance of series three, Brooker estimated to Radio Times that each 30-minute episode takes around an hour to record. As the show aired pre-watershed in its last two series, ruder discussions by panelists were cut out of the final edit.

Episodes

Series 1

Series 2

Series 3

Reception
Chris Maume of The Independent enjoyed the pilot, praising "David Mitchell's profound disgruntlement" at modern technology. Maume said that though others criticised the "nastiness", he "could have handled more", suggesting that "Brooker's misanthropy dial was only turned up half way". In The Guardian, Elisabeth Mahoney found it "initially unsettling" to hear the "funny but breathtakingly dark comic vision" of the first episode on BBC Radio 4, describing Brooker as "bitterly acerbic". Stephanie Billen, a writer for The Observer, said that the premise "sounds like only half an idea", but that "there are plenty of laugh-aloud moments". The Guardians Camilla Redmond wrote of the first series, "the powers of Charlie Brooker's persuasiveness are showcased in all their splendour".

In Radio Times, Ron Hewitt praised of the second series that Brooker is "a master at highlighting the comedy of the dark side", doing it in "a warm, mutually-inclusive, sharing way that's curiously uplifting. And funny". Billen reiterated that "something about the concept does not quite add up", and that the programme in practice was "entertaining mini-monologues about bad experiences or more general disasters", but that it had "guaranteed laughs" with its line-up.

Reviewing the third series, Hewitt said: "you'll laugh your socks off". Gillian Reynolds of The Telegraph said that Brooker would polarise the audience, saying "as many listening to this reversal-of-convention panel game will loathe chairman Charlie Brooker as love his iconoclasm". The Observers Miranda Sawyer characterised it as a "strange show", because Brooker is "a scurrilously witty man, but his humour... lies in his anger" and the programme is not suited to this. Sawyer criticised that the show is "actually about comedians shoe-horning little bits of their routines on to the radio".

References

Further reading

External links
 Official website

2010 radio programme debuts
2012 radio programme endings
BBC Radio 4 programmes
BBC Radio comedy programmes
British panel games
2010s British game shows